Kumara Kampana, also known as Kampana Udaiyar, was an army commander and the prince in the Vijayanagar Empire. He was the son of king Bukka I. Kumara Kampana led the successful invasion of the Madurai Sultanate. His exploits form the subject of the Sanskrit epic poem Madhura Vijayam written by his wife Gangadevi.

According to the poetic legend, it was Ganga Devi who gave Kumara Kampana the goddess' sword to fight and liberate Madurai from the Sultanate, reopen the Meenakshi Temple, and "to undertake the righting of vast wrongs", states William Jackson.

References

Vijayanagara Empire